The China Law Society is the official people's organization of Chinese legal academic professionals.  It was established in 1982 and has sub-institutions of different fields of law, such as jurisprudence, constitutional law, civil law, criminal law, etc.

The current President is Wang Chen.

List of presidents
Wu Xinyu (武新宇): July 1982 – November 1983
Zhang Youyu (张友渔): November 1983 – August 1985
Wang Zhongfang (王仲方): August 1985 – May 1991
Zou Yu (邹瑜): May 1991 – January 1997
Ren Jianxin (任建新): January 1997 – November 2003
Han Zhubin (韩杼滨): November 2003 – November 2013
Wang Lequan (王乐泉): November 2013 – March 2019
Wang Chen (王晨): March 2019 – (incumbent)

See also
 Law Yearbook of China
 Chinese Society of International Law

External links
 Official website 

Legal organizations based in China
Organizations established in 1982
1982 establishments in China